Myanmar first competed at the ASEAN Para Games in 2001.

Medal table

See also 
 Myanmar at the Paralympics
 Myanmar at the Asian Para Games
 Myanmar at the Southeast Asian Games

References

External links 

ASEAN Para Games